The following is a list of cruisers of the Netherlands grouped by type.

Unprotected cruiser
 
 Atjeh (1876)
 Tromp (1877)
 Koningin Emma der Nederlanden (ex-De Ruyter) (1879) - Captured by Germany 14 May 1940, scuttled ~1943
 De Ruyter (1880)
 Van Speyk (1882)
 Johan Willem Friso (1886)

Protected cruiser

Sumatra

Koningin Wilhelmina der Nederlanden

Holland class

Light cruisers

Java class

De Ruyter

Tromp class

  - Decommissioned in 1955, sold for scrap in 1969
  - completed as an anti-aircraft cruiser - Decommissioned in 1969, sold for scrap in 1970

De Zeven Provinciën class

  (1944) - completed as an anti-aircraft cruiser - Sold to Peru in 1973 and renamed Almirante Grau
  (1950) - completed as an anti-aircraft cruiser - Sold to Peru in 1976 and renamed Aguirre

See also
List of monitors of the Netherlands
List of battleships of the Netherlands
List of ships of the Royal Netherlands Navy

References

Netherlands
Cruisers of the Netherlands